Iberojet is a Spanish-Portuguese charter airline that operates short- and long-haul flights out of Spain and Portugal on behalf of tour operators.

History
Iberojet is owned by Barceló Viajes, and was bought by Barceló Group in 2013 following the collapse of Orizonia Corporation. The airline is headquartered in Palma de Mallorca, Spain. It previously operated as Evelop and was a subsidiary of Portuguese Orbest. On 8 December 2020, Evelop merged with Orbest and was renamed to Iberojet.

In 2021 Iberojet supplied the UK Home Office with a charter deportation plane.

In 2022, Iberojet took over all scheduled long-haul services to the Caribbean from Wamos Air.

Destinations 
Iberojet serves the following destinations:

Fleet

, the Iberojet fleet consists of the following aircraft:

References

External links

Official website

Airlines of Spain
Airlines established in 2013
Charter airlines
2013 establishments in Spain
Companies of the Balearic Islands
Palma de Mallorca